The Harrington Elementary School is a former school in central American Fork, Utah, United States, that is listed on the National Register of Historic Places.

Description
Located at 50 North Center Street, it was built in two equal stages, in 1903 and 1934. The 1903 original school design was probably a work of Richard C. Watkins; the 1934 expansion was designed by a Joseph Nelson. The 1934 addition has been asserted to be "a noteworthy example of sympathetic expansion architecture."

It was listed on the National Register of Historic Places in 1993.

See also

 National Register of Historic Places listings in Utah County, Utah

References

External links

School buildings completed in 1903
Romanesque Revival architecture in Utah
School buildings on the National Register of Historic Places in Utah
Schools in Utah County, Utah
1903 establishments in Utah
Buildings and structures in American Fork, Utah
National Register of Historic Places in Utah County, Utah